Broderip is a surname. Notable people with the surname include:

Frances Freeling Broderip (1830–1878), English children's writer
Francis Broderip (died 1871), lawyer and philanthropist
John Broderip (1719–1770), English organist
Robert Broderip (died 1808), English organist and composer
William Broderip (organist) (1683–1726), English organist
William Broderip, full name William John Broderip (1789–1859), English lawyer and naturalist